Ropicapomecyna fairmairei is a species of beetle in the family Cerambycidae, and the only species in the genus Ropicapomecyna. It was described by Stephan von Breuning in 1957.

References

Apomecynini
Beetles described in 1957
Monotypic beetle genera